Batheulima epixantha is a species of sea snail, a marine gastropod mollusc in the family Eulimidae.

Distribution
This marine species is mainly known to occur off the coasts of Brazil, within the southern Atlantic Ocean.

Description
The maximum recorded shell length is 6.6 mm.

Habitat
Minimum recorded depth is 129 m. Maximum recorded depth is 133 m.

References

External links

Eulimidae
Gastropods described in 2002